In enzymology, a sulfate adenylyltransferase (ADP) is an enzyme that catalyzes the chemical reaction

ADP + sulfate  phosphate + adenylyl sulfate

Thus, the two substrates of this enzyme are ADP and sulfate, whereas its two products are phosphate and adenylyl sulfate.

This enzyme belongs to the family of transferases, specifically those transferring phosphorus-containing nucleotide groups (nucleotidyltransferases).  The systematic name of this enzyme class is ADP:sulfate adenylyltransferase. Other names in common use include ADP-sulfurylase, sulfate (adenosine diphosphate) adenylyltransferase, and adenosine diphosphate sulfurylase.  This enzyme participates in sulfur metabolism.

References

 
 

EC 2.7.7
Enzymes of unknown structure